Rector is an extinct town in northwest Shannon County, in the U.S. state of Missouri. The GNIS classifies it as a populated place. The community is located in Rector Hollow, which is a tributary to Gladden Creek approximately one mile to the west. It is on Missouri Route J two miles west of Missouri Route 19.

A post office called Rector was established in 1894, and remained in operation until 1954. The community has the name of the local Rector family.

References

Ghost towns in Missouri
Ghost towns in Shannon County, Missouri